Alloblennius parvus, the  dwarf blenny, is a combtooth blenny, from the subfamily Salarinae, of the family Blenniidae. It is a tropical blenny which is known from the western Indian Ocean, and has been recorded swimming at a depth range of 6–10 metres. Dwarf blennies have pale bodies with a dark spot between their first and second dorsal spines. Males have a dark colouring beneath their heads and around their pectoral fins, and can reach a maximum standard length of 2.6 centimetres (1.02 inches). The blennies are oviparous.

Etymology
The species epithet "parvus" (Latin: "little") refers to the size of the species, from which the common name is also derived.

References

External links
 Alloblennius parvus at ITIS
 Alloblennius parvus at WoRMS

parvus
Fish described in 1978